The Royal Wessex Yeomanry is a reserve armoured regiment of the British Army Reserve consisting of five squadrons.  Formerly part of 43 (Wessex) Brigade, the regiment joined 3rd (UK) Division in July 2014, to provide armoured (main battle tank) resilience to the three armoured regiments within the Reaction Force.  In 2015 the regiment was moved from the operational command of 3rd (UK) Division to 1st Armoured Infantry Brigade, and later to 12th Armoured Brigade Combat Team (United Kingdom), but members of the regiment still wear the 3rd (UK) Division formation badge to reflect their role in supporting the three armoured regiments in the division (QRH, KRH, and RTR).

History
The regiment can trace its history back to 4 June 1794, a meeting of country gentlemen at the Bear Inn in Devizes decided to raise a body of ten independent troops of Yeomanry for the county of Wiltshire, which became the Royal Wiltshire Yeomanry.  The Wessex Yeomanry was formed on 1 April 1971 by re-raising cadres from the Royal Wiltshire Yeomanry, the Royal Gloucestershire Hussars and the Royal Devon Yeomanry to form four squadrons.  The Wessex Yeomanry was granted its royal title, becoming the Royal Wessex Yeomanry, on 8 June 1979. Initially roled as infantry, in the 1980s it was re-roled as a reconnaissance regiment and became one of the Military Home Defence Reconnaissance Regiments.  Following the Strategic Defence Review, the regiment merged with the Dorset Yeomanry in July 1999 and was reorganised and re-roled into its current ORBAT.

Before the Army 2020 plan, the regiment had three roles:

The training of Challenger 2 main battle tank crewmen as Turret Crew Replacements.  This commitment was provided by B (RWY), C (RGH) and D (RDY) Squadrons.
Armour Replacement.  This role was provided by A (DY) Squadron.
The provision of skilled officers and senior non-commissioned officers to support the Regular Army on operations as 'watchkeepers' and liaison officers.  This was provided by all four squadrons.

Since 2013, the regiment has been the United Kingdom's only Armoured Reinforcement Regiment, providing armoured (Main Battle Tank) resilience to the three remaining regular Army Armoured Regiments: the Queen's Royal Hussars (QRH), the King's Royal Hussars (KRH) and the Royal Tank Regiment (RTR).  All five squadrons train Challenger 2 crewmen.  The RWxY has conducted Challenger 2 (CR2) driver training in Bovington, Sennelager Germany, Salisbury Plain Training Area and live firing at Lulworth and Castlemartin Ranges.

Each squadron maintains the traditions of its forebear regiment, maintaining a sense of pride and rivalry.  In 2011, there was a Regimental Celebration of 40 years since the founding of the Royal Wessex Yeomanry, although, at this time, the Dorset Yeomanry was not part of the regiment. Earl of Wessex, the Regimental Colonel, visited, met with members of the regiment and their families and also participated in a private guided tour of the neighbouring Tank Museum.

Recruitment
Like all of the regiments within the British Army the regiment allows recruits from all over the country. However, this regiment traditionally recruits from counties such as Devon, Dorset, Gloucestershire, Shropshire and Wiltshire, along with neighbouring counties such as Cornwall, Hampshire, Oxfordshire and Somerset.

Organisation
Each squadron keeps within its title the name of its antecedent, county, yeomanry regiment:

Regimental Headquarters, at Allenby Barracks, Bovington Camp BH20
A (Dorset Yeomanry) Squadron, at Allenby Barracks, Bovington Camp BH20
B (Royal Wiltshire Yeomanry) Squadron, at Army Reserve Centre, Old Sarum SP4
C (Royal Gloucestershire Hussars) Squadron, at Army Reserve Centre, Somerford Road, Cirencester GL7
C (Cassino) Troop, at Venning Barracks, Donnington TF2
D (Royal Devon Yeomanry) Squadron, at Wyvern Barracks, Exeter EX2
Barnstaple Troop, at Fortescue Lines, Barnstaple EX32
Y (Royal Wiltshire Yeomanry) Squadron, at Army Reserve Centre, Swindon SN1
Under the Future Soldier Programme, C and Y Squadrons will amalgamate into a single C Squadron.

Unusually, B Squadron is the senior of the regiment's five squadrons. This is because the Royal Wiltshire Yeomanry is the senior Yeomanry regiment in the Yeomanry Order of Precedence, having been raised in 1794.  It is not designated as A Squadron (which would be the usual practice) because there was already a Royal Wiltshire Yeomanry squadron in the Royal Yeomanry with which it could be confused.  In summer 2014, this Royal Wiltshire Yeomanry Squadron joined the Royal Wessex Yeomanry, becoming Y Squadron.

The Earl of Wessex KG GCVO ADC is the Royal Honorary Colonel of the Royal Wessex Yeomanry.

Uniform
The Royal Wessex Yeomanry Tactical Recognition Flash (TRF) is taken from the 74th (Yeomanry) Division, whose insignia was a broken spur in a black diamond during the First World War.  It is used to signify that its units were once mounted but now served as infantry.  The TRF took its colour scheme from the facings of the collars and cuffs of the Royal Gloucestershire Hussars (buff), Royal Wiltshire Yeomanry, Dorset Yeomanry and the Royal Devon Yeomanry (all scarlet).  In 2016 the colour scheme of the TRF was changed, replacing the scarlet with blue, and the 'broken spur' replaced by a complete spur.

The regiment wears a brown beret, similar to that worn by the King’s Royal Hussars, with a square black patch behind the cap badge to represent the RTR affiliation.  Until July 2014, each squadron wore the cap badge of its antecedent Yeomanry regiment, meaning that, unlike most other British Army regiments, the RWxY still had four cap badges. On 5 July 2014 all squadrons, including Y Squadron (formerly A Squadron the Royal Yeomanry), adopted a single unifying cap badge featuring the white dragon of England.

Lineage

Affiliations
The Queen's Royal Hussars
The King's Royal Hussars 
The Royal Tank Regiment 
HMS Enterprise

Commanding officers
 2003–2005: Lt Col The Lord de Mauley TD FCA
 2005–2007: Lt Col M.J.R. Rothwell TD
 2007–2010: Lt Col R. Frampton-Hobbs
 2010–2012: Lt Col R.B. Trant 
 2012–2015: Lt Col C. MacGregor
 2015–2017: Lt Col J. Godfrey
 2017–2020: Lt Col R.A. Burdon-Cooper
 2020–2022: Lt Col C.J. Speers
 2022–Present: Lt Col A.E. Sharman

Honorary Colonels
1971–1984: Col The Duke of Beaufort KG PC GCVO 
1984–1989: Maj The Baron Margadale TD DL 
1989–1992: Maj Gen Sir Sir J.H.B. Acland KCB CBE DL 
1992–1997: Gen Sir C.J. Waters GCB CBE 
1997–2000: Col J.E. Baring Hills TD DL 
2000–2003: Lt Col J.G. Peel TD DL 
2003–2010: Maj Gen A.G. Denaro CBE DL 
2010–2015: Gen Sir A.R.D. Shirreff KCB CBE 
2015–2022: Lt Col The Lord de Mauley TD FCA 
2022–present: Mr S.A. Hart MP

Order of precedence
For the purposes of parading, the Regiments of the British Army are listed according to an order of precedence.  This is the order in which the various corps of the army parade, from right to left, with the unit at the extreme right being the most senior.

Notes

References

External links 

 

Yeomanry regiments of the British Army
Military units and formations established in 1971
Royal Armoured Corps
1971 establishments in the United Kingdom
Wessex